David T. Rubin (born 6 March 1968) is an American gastroenterologist and educator. He is the Joseph B. Kirsner Professor of Medicine at the University of Chicago, where he is also the Chief of the Section of Gastroenterology, Hepatology and Nutrition. He also serves as the Co-Director of the Digestive Diseases Center.

Education and Training 
David T. Rubin obtained his Doctor of Medicine degree with honors at the University of Chicago Pritzker School of Medicine. He went on to complete his internship, residency, and fellowship at the University of Chicago where he served as Chief Resident and Chief Fellow. He also completed a fellowship in Clinical Medical Ethics at the MacLean Center for Clinical Medical Ethics and a leadership development course at the Harvard T.H. Chan School of Public Health.

Career 
David T. Rubin specializes in the treatment and assessment of inflammatory bowel diseases (Crohn's disease and ulcerative colitis).

Dr. Rubin performs scientific research related to outcomes in inflammatory bowel diseases with particular interest in the prevention of cancer associated with these diseases and strategies to modify the disease course and control inflammation. He is involved in the design and execution of clinical trials for new therapies in inflammatory bowel diseases.

Dr. Rubin is a Fellow of the American Gastroenterological Association (AGAF), the American College of Gastroenterology (FACG), the American Society for Gastrointestinal Endoscopy (FASGE), the American College of Physicians (FACP), and the Royal College of Physicians in Edinburgh (FRCP (Edinburgh)). Dr. Rubin is a Co-Founder (with Dr. Marla Dubinsky) of Cornerstones Health, Inc, a non-profit medical education organization. He will serve as the chair of the National Scientific Advisory Committee of Crohn's & Colitis Foundation from 2021-2024.

Selected Works and Publications 
Dr. Rubin is the editor of Curbside Consultation in IBD: 49 Clinical Questions, second edition, and associate editor of Sleisenger and Fordtran's Gastrointestinal and Liver Disease, eleventh edition. He is an associate editor of the journals of Gastroenterology, Intestinal Research, and Gastroenterology & Hepatology, and Editor in Chief of the ACG Education Universe.

 AGA Clinical Practice Update on Management of Inflammatory Bowel Disease During the COVID-19 Pandemic: Expert Commentary. Rubin DT, Feuerstein JD, Wang AY, Cohen RD. Gastroenterology. 2020;159(1):350-357.
 ACG Clinical Guideline: Ulcerative Colitis in Adults. Rubin DT, Ananthakrishnan AN, Siegel CA, Sauer BG, Long MD. Am J Gastroenterol. 2019;114:384-413. 
 Safety and efficacy of combination treatment with calcineurin inhibitors and vedolizumab in patients with refractory inflammatory bowel disease. Christensen B, Gibson P, Micic D, Colman RJ, Goeppinger S, Kassim O, Yarur A, Weber C, Cohen RD, Rubin DT. Clin Gastroenterol Hepatol. 2019;17(3):486-493.
 Histologic Normalization Occurs in Ulcerative Colitis and Is Associated With Improved Clinical Outcomes. Christensen B, Hanauer SB, Erlich J, Kassim O, Gibson PR, Turner JR, Hart J, Rubin DT.  Clin Gastroenterol Hepatol. 2017;5:1557-64. 
 The Crohn's and Colitis Foundation of America Survey of Inflammatory Bowel Disease Patient Healthcare Access.  Rubin DT, Feld LD, Goeppinger S, Kim S, Margolese JM, Rosh J, Rubin M, Rodriquez DM, Wingate L.  Inflamm Bowel Dis.  2017;23:224-32. 
 Using a Treat-to-Target Management Strategy to Improve the Doctor-Patient Relationship in Inflammatory Bowel Disease. Rubin DT, Krugliak Cleveland N.  Am J Gastroenterol. 2015;110:1252-6. 
 Ethical Consideration for Clinical Trials in Inflammatory Bowel Disease.  Rubin DT, Becker S, Siegler M.  Gastroenterol Hepatol. 2014;10:37-41. 
 Inflammation is an Independent Risk Factor for Colonic Neoplasia in Patients with Ulcerative Colitis: A Case-Control Study. Rubin DT, Huo D, Kinnucan JA, Sedrak MS, McCullom NE, Bunnag AP, Raun-Royer EP, Cohen RD, Hanauer SB, Hart J, Turner JR.  Clin Gastroenterol Hepatol.  2013;11:1601-8.

Honors and awards

References

External links 
 Rubin Lab Website
 Twitter
 Section of Gastroenterology, Hepatology, and Nutrition at The University of Chicago

American gastroenterologists
University of Chicago faculty
1968 births
Living people
Pritzker School of Medicine alumni